Kamrul Ahsan is a Bangladeshi diplomat. He is currently serving as his country's Ambassador to the Russian Federation. He is also concurrently accredited as the Ambassador of Bangladesh to the Republic of Belarus and Kazakhstan. Before joining in his position in Moscow, he  served as Secretary for Bilateral and Consular Affairs in the Ministry of Foreign Affairs of Bangladesh.

Ahsan also served as his country's envoy to Canada and Singapore. He was High Commissioner to Canada from September 2012 to May 2016. In Singapore, he served as High Commissioner from August 2007 to August 2012.

He was concurrently accredited as Bangladesh Ambassador to Argentina, Cuba, Venezuela and Jamaica from 2012 to 2016 with residence in Ottawa.

Early life and education 
Ahsan was born at Noakhali in Bangladesh. He attended elementary and middle school in Comilla at Our Lady of Fatima High School and Comilla Zilla School respectively. He studied at Dhaka College at higher secondary level. He obtained his Bachelor of Science degree in Civil Engineering from Bangladesh University of Engineering and Technology (BUET) in 1984.

He also studied at Beijing Language and Culture University in China (19891991) and attended a course on security issues at the Asia Pacific Center for Security Studies in Hawaii, US (2000).

Career
Ahsan worked as an Assistant Engineer at the Bangladesh Rural Electrification Board before joining the Ministry of Foreign Affairs of Bangladesh as an Assistant Secretary in 1988.

In his first diplomatic assignment, from 1992 to 1995, he served as Second Secretary and First Secretary at Bangladesh Embassy in Beijing, China. From 1995 to 1999, he served at Bangladesh High Commission in London, United Kingdom initially as First Secretary and later as Counsellor.

At headquarters in Dhaka from 1999 to 2001, he served as Director (Personnel), Director (South Asia and SAARC) and Director (Foreign Secretary's Office).

From 2001 to 2003, he served initially as Counsellor and then as the Deputy Chief of the Mission at the Bangladesh Embassy in Washington DC, United States. In September 2003, he was appointed as Bangladesh Consul General for Dubai and Northern Emirates, United Arab Emirates where he served till August 2007.

Kamrul Ahsan represented Bangladesh at different international negotiations. He was in the drafting group for Least Developed Countries (LDCs) during the Framework Convention on Climate Change Meetings in Geneva. He was Bangladesh delegate to the International Maritime Organization from 1996 to 1999. He attended the IISS Shangri La Dialogue, Asia's premier security summit, at Singapore from 2008 to 2012.

He also helped to form Bangladesh Business Chamber of Singapore.

Honours

Ahsan was the Dean of the Diplomatic and Consular Corps in Singapore. In Canada, he also served as the Dean of the Asia Pacific Diplomatic Corps.

Ahsan is a member of the Board of Governors of Bangladesh Institute of International and Strategic Studies (BIISS). He is a Life Fellow of the Institution of Engineers, Bangladesh. 

He contributed to a book titled ’Little Red Dot, The: Reflections Of Foreign Ambassadors On Singapore - Volume III’ published by Institute of Public Policy, Singapore.

Personal
Ahsan is married to Saira Nazneen Ahsan and has two sons - Zoheb Ahsan and Aaryan Ahsan.

References 

High Commissioners of Bangladesh to Canada
High Commissioners of Bangladesh to Jamaica
High Commissioners of Bangladesh to Singapore
Living people
Ambassadors of Bangladesh to Venezuela
Ambassadors of Bangladesh to Cuba
Ambassadors of Bangladesh to Argentina
Bangladesh University of Engineering and Technology alumni
1962 births
People from Sonaimuri Upazila